Pedro Ivo Ferreira Caminhas (7 September 1952 – 11 April 2021) was a Brazilian politician.

Biography
A member of Podemos, he served on the Legislative Assembly of Minas Gerais from 2001 to 2011 after having served on the City Council of Betim from 1993 to 2001. He was also Deputy Mayor of Betim from 2009 to 2013.

Pedro Ivo Ferreira Caminhas died of COVID-19 in Betim on 11 April 2021 at the age of 68.

References

1952 births
2021 deaths
Podemos (Brazil) politicians
Members of the Legislative Assembly of Minas Gerais
Deaths from the COVID-19 pandemic in Minas Gerais